Reginald Stuart Lindsell (18 July 1892, Biggleswade, Bedfordshire – 9 July 1969, London) was a British actor, often seen in upper-class roles. He was sometimes credited as R. Stuart Lindsell.

He also served as an officer in the Middlesex Regiment of the British Army, having been commissioned in September 1911 after attending the Royal Military College, Sandhurst.

Filmography

References

External links

1892 births
1969 deaths
English male stage actors
English male film actors
People from Biggleswade
20th-century English male actors
Middlesex Regiment officers
20th-century British Army personnel
Military personnel from Bedfordshire
Graduates of the Royal Military College, Sandhurst